Price controls are restrictions set in place and enforced by governments, on the prices that can be charged for goods and services in a market. The intent behind implementing such controls can stem from the desire to maintain affordability of goods even during shortages, and to slow inflation, or, alternatively, to ensure a minimum income for providers of certain goods or to try to achieve a living wage. There are two primary forms of price control: a price ceiling, the maximum price that can be charged; and a price floor, the minimum price that can be charged. A well-known example of a price ceiling is rent control, which limits the increases that a landlord is permitted by government to charge for rent. A widely used price floor is minimum wage (wages are the price of labor). Historically, price controls have often been imposed as part of a larger incomes policy package also employing wage controls and other regulatory elements.

Although price controls are routinely used by governments, Western economists generally agree that price controls do not accomplish what they intend to, and many economists instead recommend such controls should be avoided. For example, nearly three-quarters of a sample of 1,350 U.S. economists surveyed in the early 1990s disagreed with the statement, "Wage-price controls are a useful policy option in the control of inflation."

History

The Roman Emperor Diocletian tried to set maximum prices for all commodities in the late 3rd century AD but with little success. In the early 14th century, the Delhi Sultanate ruler Alauddin Khalji instituted several market reforms, which included price-fixing for a wide range of goods, including grains, cloth, slaves and animals. However, a few months after his death, these measures were revoked by his son Qutbuddin Mubarak Shah. During the French Revolution, the Law of the Maximum set price limits on the sale of food and other staples.

Governments in planned economies typically control prices on most or all goods but have not sustained high economic performance and have been almost entirely replaced by mixed economies. Price controls have also been used in modern times in less-planned economies, such as rent control. During World War I, the United States Food Administration enforced price controls on food. Price controls were also imposed in the US and Nazi Germany during World War II.

Postwar

Wage controls have been tried in many countries to reduce inflation, seldom successfully. Modern neoclassical economic theory supports the alternative remedy of reducing the money supply and proposes that monetary inflation is caused by too much money creation by the central bank.

United Kingdom

The National Board for Prices and Incomes was created by the government of Harold Wilson in 1965 in an attempt to solve the problem of inflation in the British economy by managing wages and prices. The Prices and Incomes Act 1966 c. 33 affected UK labour law, regarding wage levels and price policies. It allowed the government to begin a process to scrutinise rising levels of wages (then around 8% per year) by initiating reports and inquiries and ultimately giving orders for a standstill. The objective was to control inflation. It proved unpopular after the 1960s.

United States

In the United States, price controls have been enacted several times. The first time price controls were enacted nationally was in 1906 as a part of the Hepburn Act. In World War I the War Industries Board was established to set priorities, fix prices, and standardize products to support the war efforts of the United States. During the 1930s, the National Industrial Recovery Act (NIRA) created the National Recovery Administration, that set prices and created codes of "fair practices". In May 1935, the Supreme Court held that the mandatory codes section of NIRA were unconstitutional, in the court case of Schechter Poultry Corp. v. United States.

In 1971, President Richard Nixon issued Executive Order 11615 (pursuant to the Economic Stabilization Act of 1970), imposing a 90-day freeze on wages and prices. The constitutionality of this action was challenged and upheld in the case of 

The individual states have sometimes chosen to implement their own control policies. In the 1860s, several midwestern states of the United States, namely Minnesota, Iowa, Wisconsin, and Illinois, enacted a series of laws called the Granger Laws, primarily to regulate rising fare prices of railroad and grain elevator companies.

California controls the prices of electricity within the state, which conservative economist Thomas Sowell blames for the occasional electricity shortages the state experiences. Sowell said in 2001, "Since the utility companies have been paying more for electricity than they were allowed to charge their customers, they were operating in the red and the financial markets are downgrading their bonds." California's price-setting board agreed to raise rates but not as much as the companies were paying on the wholesale market for their electricity. Economist Lawrence Makovich contended, "We've already seen in California that price caps on retail rates increased demand and made the shortage worse and price caps also forced the largest utility, Pacific Gas and Electric Company, into bankruptcy in four months." While some charged that electricity providers had in past years charged above-market rates, in 2002 the San Francisco Chronicle reported that before the blackouts, many energy providers left the state because they could make a greater profit in other Western states. The Federal Energy Regulatory Commission stepped in and set price caps for each megawatt of power bought after lifting the caps to avoid rolling blackouts six months previously.

The state of Hawaii briefly introduced a cap on the wholesale price of gasoline (the Gas Cap Law) in an effort to fight "price gouging" in that state in 2005. Because it was widely seen as too soft and ineffective, it was repealed shortly thereafter.

Venezuela

According to Girish Gupta from The Guardian, price controls have created a scarcity of basic goods and made black markets flourish under President Maduro.

India

In India, the government first enacted price control in 2013 for the Drug Price Control order. This order gave local regulatory body, and the Pharmaceutical Pricing Authority the power to set ceiling prices on the National List of Essential medicines.

Sri Lanka

In 2021 the Sri Lankan government enacted price controls on several essential items resulting in shortages.

Price floor

A price floor is a government- or group-imposed price control or limit on how low a price can be charged for a product, good, commodity, or service. A price floor must be higher than the equilibrium price in order to be effective. The equilibrium price, commonly called the "market price", is the price where economic forces such as supply and demand are balanced and in the absence of external influences the (equilibrium) values of economic variables will not change, often described as the point at which quantity demanded and quantity supplied are equal (in a perfectly competitive market). Governments use price floors to keep certain prices from going too low.

Two common price floors are minimum wage laws and supply management in Canadian agriculture. Other price floors include regulated US airfares prior to 1978 and minimum price per-drink laws for alcohol.

Advantages of a price floor are:
 Motivates producers to produce more.
 Prevents the fluctuation of prices of agricultural products.
 Reduces the over-exploitation of producers.

Disadvantages of a price floor are:
 Supply will exceed demand.
 Resources are wasted.
 The government may be forced to buy the excess supply or it may be discarded (e.g., in an agricultural context).

Price ceiling

A related government intervention to price floor, which is also a price control, is the price ceiling; it sets the maximum price that can legally be charged for a good or service, with a common example being rent control.

A price ceiling is a price control, or limit, on how high a price is charged for a product, commodity, or service. Governments use price ceilings to protect consumers from conditions that could make commodities prohibitively expensive. Such conditions can occur during periods of high inflation, in the event of an investment bubble, or in the event of  monopoly ownership of a product,  all of which can cause problems if imposed for a long period without controlled rationing, leading to shortages. Further problems can occur if a government sets unrealistic price ceilings, causing business failures, stock crashes, or even economic crises. In fully unregulated market economies, price ceilings do not exist.

While price ceilings are often imposed by governments, there are also price ceilings that are implemented by non-governmental organizations such as companies, such as the practice of resale price maintenance. With resale price maintenance, a manufacturer and its distributors agree that the distributors will sell the manufacturer's product at certain prices (resale price maintenance), at or below a price ceiling (maximum resale price maintenance) or at or above a price floor.

Isabella Weber and Paul Krugman debate on price controls 
In December 2021, Isabella Weber deeply influenced the inflation debate (Allenbach-Ammann & Makszimov, 2022) by suggesting the implementation of price controls in an opinion piece in the Guardian (Weber, 2022). She believes it is the third option to deal with the global energy crisis, next to either waiting for the inflation to pass or raising interest rates and implementing austerity measures.

High inflation and record-breaking profits were measured in 2021 (Reuters, 2021). The German Bundesbank found that these profits, and thus the consequent higher prices, are artificially manufactured. Companies are increasing their profit margins as well as costs from supply chain difficulties (Allenbach-Ammann & Makszimov, 2022). Weber compares this high inflation situation of 2021-2022 with the period right after the second world war. Just like the war, the pandemic has created bottlenecks in the economy due to an abrupt restructuring of production. Weber refers to this after-war period because then, inflation was tackled by strategic price controls that were still left during the war (Weber, 2022).

Additionally, she claims that implementing price controls would have multiple positive aspects. Firstly, it would win time to deal with the pandemic-created bottlenecks in the economy. Secondly, monetary stability would improve, which is needed for several societal goals, like mitigation of environmental decay, carbon neutrality, and economic resilience (Weber, 2022).

Paul Krugman, an opinion writer for The New York Times, responded to Weber in a tweet, calling her idea “truly stupid” (Showalter, 2022; Reed, 2022). After many critiques, Krugman deleted his tweet and apologized for his harsh tone (Krugman, 2022). Lawrence W. Reed echoed Krugman’s opinion and took it even further by mocking Weber (Reed, 2022). He claims that price controls do not work and are a disguised way of controlling people, not prices, because the increasing prices are only the consequence of inflation, not the cause. Because monetary authorities inflate, prices rise after, according to Reed.

In an interview, Weber defends her stance on price controls (Gaal, 2022). To counter the critique that indicates that price caps or controls disincentivize people to save energy, she stated that this depends on the cap you implement. She advocates for a cap on necessary amounts, and any overconsumption needs to be paid with higher market prices. Another argument against price controls Weber denounces is that putting a price cap on one good will lead to controlling all prices. However, as Weber says, most countries already have a politically predetermined price for many essential goods, which has yet to lead to price controls on everything (Gaal, 2022).

Implementation of price controls in Europe: the case of Spain and Portugal 
The high inflation of 2021 and 2022 has urged the EU member states to take measures. Spain and Portugal imposed a cap on natural gas prices (News Desk, 2022b; Fonseca, 2022). They received permission from the European Commission because the Iberian Peninsula is not as connected to the European power marker as other member states (News Desk, 2022a). Spain and Portugal are less dependent on Russian gas, as they mainly import from Algeria and produce much of their electricity through renewables.

This measure will help around 70% of businesses and about 40% of households (News Desk, 2022a; News Desk, 2022b). The gas price for power production will remain under the cap of around 50 euros per megawatt hour (News Desk, 2022a). Portuguese politicians in the government said that these measures would protect vulnerable households, socialize the cost and prices of energy, and most importantly, protect against the volatile energy prices in Europe (News Desk, 2022b; Fonseca, 2022; Lusa, 2022).

Critics say these measures will distort the markets and result in higher gas consumption (News Desk, 2022b). Additionally, they believe it might disrupt competition in the European markets. However, as noted above, the Spanish and Portuguese power markets are more self-sufficient and tightly linked to one another, so the impact on the other EU countries should remain minimal (News Desk, 2022a).

Criticism

The primary criticism leveled against the price ceiling type of price controls is that by keeping prices artificially low, demand is increased to the point where supply cannot keep up, leading to shortages in the price-controlled product.  For example, Lactantius wrote that Diocletian "by various taxes, he had made all things exceedingly expensive, attempted by a law to limit their prices. Then much blood [of merchants] was shed for trifles, men were afraid to offer anything for sale, and the scarcity became more excessive and grievous than ever. Until, in the end, the [price limit] law, after having proved destructive to many people, was from mere necessity abolished."

As with Diocletian's Edict on Maximum Prices, shortages lead to black markets where prices for the same good exceed those of an uncontrolled market. Furthermore, once controls are removed, prices will immediately increase, which can temporarily shock the economic system. Black markets flourish in most countries during wartime. States that are engaged in total war or other large-scale, extended wars often impose restrictions on home use of critical resources that are needed for the war effort, such as food, gasoline, rubber, metal, etc., typically through rationing. In most cases, a black market develops to supply rationed goods at exorbitant prices. The rationing and price controls enforced in many countries during World War II encouraged widespread black market activity. One source of black-market meat under wartime rationing was by farmers declaring fewer domestic animal births to the Ministry of Food than actually happened. Another in Britain was supplies from the US, intended only for use in US army bases on British land, but leaked into the local native British black market.

A classic example of how price controls cause shortages was during the Arab oil embargo between October 19, 1973, and March 17, 1974. Long lines of cars and trucks quickly appeared at retail gas stations in the U.S. and some stations closed because of a shortage of fuel at the low price set by the U.S. Cost of Living Council. The fixed price was below what the market would otherwise bear and, as a result, the inventory disappeared. It made no difference whether prices were voluntarily or involuntarily posted below the market clearing price. Scarcity resulted in either case. Price controls fail to achieve their proximate aim, which is to reduce prices paid by retail consumers, but such controls do manage to reduce supply.

Nobel Memorial Prize winner Milton Friedman said, "We economists don't know much, but we do know how to create a shortage. If you want to create a shortage of tomatoes, for example, just pass a law that retailers can't sell tomatoes for more than two cents per pound. Instantly you'll have a tomato shortage. It's the same with oil or gas."

U.S. President Richard Nixon's Secretary of the Treasury, George Shultz, enacting Nixon's "New Economic Policy", lifted price controls that had begun in 1971 (part of the Nixon Shock). This lifting of price controls resulted in a rapid increase in prices. Price freezes were re-established five months later.  Stagflation was eventually ended in the United States when the Federal Reserve under chairman Paul Volcker raised interest rates to unusually high levels.  This successfully ended high inflation but caused a recession that ended in the early 1980s.

See also

 2021–2022 global energy crisis
 Administered prices
 Capital control
 Council on Wage and Price Stability
 Monopsony

References

Further reading

External links 

 "The Theory of Price Controls" by Stephanie Laguerodie et Francisco Vergara (de Review of Political Economy, October 2008)
 "Price Control "About Price control money making